The 2013 FIM Motocross World Championship was the 57th F.I.M. Motocross World Championship season. It included 36 races at 18 events including Qatar, Thailand, The Netherlands, Italy, Bulgaria, Portugal, Brazil, Mexico, France, Sweden, Latvia, Finland, Germany, Czech Republic, Belgium and Great Britain.

2013 calendar
The 2013 calendars of the FIM Motocross World Championships promoted by Youthstream were finalised on 2 March 2013. The MXGP of Mexico, which was scheduled for the 26 May weekend, was cancelled.

Participants
 Riders with red background numbers are defending champions. All riders were announced with numbers on February 11, 2013. The entry list of riders with riders teams announced for the first MXGP of the 2013 FIM MX1 and MX2 World Championships on February 16, 2013.

MX1 participants

MX2 participants

Championship standings

MX1

MX2

MX3

References

External links
 

Motocross
Motocross World Championship seasons